Scrobipalpula seniorum is a moth in the family Gelechiidae. It was described by Povolný in 2000. It is found in  North Macedonia and Greece.

The larvae feed on Achillea ageratifolia and Centaurea pindicola. They mine the leaves of their host plant. The mines have the form of blotches in the lowers leaves. Mines are also made from between spun leaves.

References

Scrobipalpula
Moths described in 2000